Grace Lutheran Church may refer to:
 Grace Lutheran Church (Phoenix, Arizona) is a historic church in Phoenix, Arizona, on the U.S. National Register of Historic Places.
 Grace Lutheran Church (Uniontown, Missouri), member congregation of the Lutheran Church–Missouri Synod
 Grace Lutheran Church of Barber,  U.S. National Registered Historic Place near Ryegate, Montana
 Grace Lutheran Church (Sheyenne, North Dakota), Lutheran church in Sheyenne, North Dakota
Grace Lutheran Church (Carrollton, Georgia), an ELCA affiliated church in Carrollton, Georgia.
Grace Lutheran Church (Lincoln, Nebraska), an ELCA affiliated church in Lincoln, Nebraska.